The Magritte Award for Best Film (French: Magritte du meilleur film) is an award presented annually by the Académie André Delvaux. It is one of the Magritte Awards, which were established to recognize excellence in Belgian cinematic achievements. The 1st Magritte Awards ceremony was held in 2011 with Mr. Nobody receiving the award for Best Film. As of the 2022 ceremony, Madly in Life is the most recent winner in this category.

Winners and nominees
In the list below, winners are listed first in the colored row, followed by the other nominees.

2010s

2020s

References

External links
 Magritte Awards official website
 Magritte Award for Best Film at AlloCiné

2011 establishments in Belgium
Awards established in 2011
Awards for best film
Lists of films by award
Film